A dependant (US spelling: dependent) is a person who relies on another as a primary source of income. A common-law spouse who is financially supported by their partner may also be included in this definition. In some jurisdictions, supporting a dependant may enable the provider to claim a tax deduction.

In the United Kingdom, a full-time student in higher education who financially supports another adult may qualify for an Adult Dependant's Grant.

Taxation
In the US, a taxpayer may claim exemptions for their dependants.

See also
 Military dependent

References

Interpersonal relationships